Rogearvin Argelo "Roger" Bernadina (born June 12, 1984) is a Dutch Curaçaoan professional baseball outfielder for Curaçao Neptunus of the Honkbal Hoofdklasse. He has played in Major League Baseball (MLB) for the Washington Nationals, Philadelphia Phillies, Cincinnati Reds, and Los Angeles Dodgers. He has also played for the Dutch national baseball team in international competitions such as the World Baseball Classic. He played for Team Netherlands in the 2019 European Baseball Championship, Africa/Europe 2020 Olympic Qualification tournament, and the 2019 WBSC Premier12.

Career

Washington Nationals

Bernadina was signed at age 17 by the then-Montreal Expos as a nondrafted free agent in 2001. He beat out Todd Liebman for the last roster spot on the Dutch national team for the World Baseball Classic back in June 2012.

Bernadina was called up to the major leagues the first time on June 28, 2008, to replace the injured Lastings Milledge. His major league debut came the next day, and he hit a single to right field in his first major league at bat.

Bernadina started 2009 in the minors, but was called up on April 15.  After appearing in two games, he made his first start of the season on April 18. In the eighth inning, he "made a spectacular catch against the wall" against the Florida Marlins and fractured his right ankle, although he earned the nickname "The Shark".

On May 12, 2010, Bernadina hit his first and second big league home runs against the New York Mets. The second came in the ninth inning off Francisco Rodriguez, giving the Nationals the lead in a game they would ultimately win. He also made a remarkable leaping catch in right field that likely robbed Met Jeff Francoeur of a bases-clearing triple.

2012 was Bernadina’s best year in the majors. He compiled a slash line of .291/.372/.405 and made a spectacular game-saving catch against the wall at Minute Maid Park.

On August 19, 2013, Bernadina was released to make room on the roster for David DeJesus, who was acquired from the Chicago Cubs.

Philadelphia Phillies
Two days after being released by the Nationals, Bernadina signed with the Philadelphia Phillies. He appeared in 27 games for them and hit .187. He was outrighted off the roster on October 16, 2013.

Cincinnati Reds
On January 31, 2014, Bernadina signed a minor league contract with the Cincinnati Reds that contained a spring training invitation. After making the opening day roster, he was designated for assignment on May 3, but was called back up after an injury to Jay Bruce. Bernadina was designated for assignment again on June 21, 2014 On June 27, Bernadina was released and became a free agent. He hit only .153 in 44 games for the Reds.

Los Angeles Dodgers
On July 7, 2014, Bernadina inked a minor league deal with the Los Angeles Dodgers. He was assigned to the Triple-A Albuquerque Isotopes, where he hit .246 in 23 games. He was called up to the Dodgers on September 6, 2014. He was used primarily as a pinch runner for the Dodgers but also had 7 at-bats as a pinch hitter. He had two hits, one of which was a home run.

Colorado Rockies
On December 24, 2014, Bernadina signed a minor-league contract with the Colorado Rockies.

New York Mets
On February 8, 2016, Bernadina signed a minor-league contract with the New York Mets. After Spring Training, he was assigned to the AAA Las Vegas 51s.

Kia Tigers
On November 24, 2016, Bernadina signed with the Kia Tigers of the KBO League. He had a .320 batting average, 27 home runs, 111 RBIs, and 32 stolen bases in the 2017 KBO League season. On December 1, 2017, Bernadina signed a one-year, $1.1 million contract with the Tigers. His 2018 statistics included a .310 batting average, 20 home runs, and 70 RBI. He became a free agent after the 2018 season.

Ishikawa Million Stars
On March 30, 2019, he signed with the Ishikawa Million Stars of the Baseball Challenge League.

Lamigo Monkeys
On April 18, 2019, Bernadina left the Million Stars to sign with the Lamigo Monkeys of the Chinese Professional Baseball League. He posted a .256/.365/.378 slash line across 24 games before he was released by the team on June 30, 2019.

Algodoneros de Unión Laguna
On July 15, 2019, Bernadina signed with the Algodoneros de Unión Laguna of the Mexican League. He was released on February 6, 2020.

Quick Amersfoort
On August 24, 2020, Bernadina signed with the Quick Amersfoort club in the Dutch Honkbal Hoofdklasse.

Curaçao Neptunus
Bernardina signed with Curaçao Neptunus of the Dutch Honkbal Hoofdklasse for the 2021 season.

References

External links

Roger Bernadina at Baseball Almanac
Roger Bernadina at Pura Pelota (Venezuelan Professional Baseball League)
Career statistics and player information from Korea Baseball Organization
Bernadina at Kia Tigers Baseball Club 

1984 births
Living people
Albuquerque Isotopes players
Algodoneros de Guasave players
Algodoneros de Unión Laguna players
Bravos de Margarita players
Cincinnati Reds players
Columbus Clippers players
Curaçao expatriate baseball players in Japan
Curaçao expatriate baseball players in Mexico
Curaçao expatriate baseball players in Taiwan
Curaçao expatriate baseball players in the United States
Dutch expatriate baseball players in South Korea
Gulf Coast Expos players
Gulf Coast Nationals players
Harrisburg Senators players
Ishikawa Million Stars players
KBO League outfielders
Kia Tigers players
Lamigo Monkeys players
Las Vegas 51s players
Los Angeles Dodgers players
Major League Baseball players from Curaçao
Major League Baseball outfielders
Navegantes del Magallanes players
Curaçao expatriate baseball players in Venezuela
People from Willemstad
Philadelphia Phillies players
Potomac Nationals players
Savannah Sand Gnats players
Syracuse Chiefs players
Tiburones de La Guaira players
Washington Nationals players
Yaquis de Obregón players
2013 World Baseball Classic players
2023 World Baseball Classic players
2016 European Baseball Championship players
2019 European Baseball Championship players
Curaçao expatriate baseball players in Nicaragua